This is a list of suicides in Nazi Germany.  Many prominent Nazis, Nazi followers, and members of the armed forces died by suicide during the last days of World War II.  Others killed themselves after being captured. Those who committed suicide includes 8 out of 41 NSDAP regional leaders who held office between 1926 and 1945, 7 out of 47 higher SS and police leaders, 53 out of 554 Army generals, 14 out of 98 Luftwaffe generals, 11 out of 53 admirals in the Kriegsmarine, and an unknown number of junior officials.

In many cases, Nazis died by suicide with their wife and children, a type of joint suicide. There are also notable cases of suicide attempts, such as that of Ludwig Beck.

Suicides occurred in Germany, except where noted otherwise.

References

Suicides
Mass suicides
1945 in Germany